Modeste Dah  is an Upper Volta football defender who played for Upper Volta in the 1978 African Cup of Nations. He also played for Rail Club du Kadiogo

External links
11v11 Profile

1953 births
Living people
Burkinabé footballers
Burkina Faso international footballers
1978 African Cup of Nations players
Rail Club du Kadiogo players
Association football defenders
21st-century Burkinabé people